Cecilia Noel Padgham-Purich  (born 25 December 1927) is an Australian former politician. She was a member of the Northern Territory Legislative Assembly from 1977 to 1997, representing Tiwi until 1983, Koolpinyah until 1990 and Nelson thereafter.

|}

Born in Quairading, Western Australia, Padgham-Purich was initially elected as a member of the Country Liberal Party, and served as Minister for Housing and Conservation from 1983 to 1984 under Paul Everingham and Ian Tuxworth. In 1987 she lost CLP preselection, but was re-elected as an Independent. She retired in 1997 and endorsed another independent candidate, Dave Tollner, who narrowly failed to win election. Her daughter, Kezia Purick, was elected to the seat of Goyder as a CLP member in 2008. Noel has six children, Melissa, Peregrine, Gervase, Kezia, Plaxy and Thisbe.

References

|-

|-

1927 births
Living people
Members of the Northern Territory Legislative Assembly
Country Liberal Party members of the Northern Territory Legislative Assembly
Independent members of the Northern Territory Legislative Assembly
Women members of the Northern Territory Legislative Assembly
Members of the Order of Australia